The following are the lists of television and radio stations broadcasting in Cebu City in the Republic of the Philippines.

TV stations

VHF
DYSS-TV GMA TV-7      (GMA Network Inc.)
DYKC-TV RPN TV-9 (Radio Philippines Network)
DYPT-TV PTV 11      (People's Television Network)
DYTV-TV IBC TV-13      (Intercontinental Broadcasting Corporation)

UHF
DYET-TV TV5 Channel 21 (ABC Development Corporation)
DYLS-TV GTV 27      (GMA Network Inc.)
DYAN-TV One Sports 29      (Nation Broadcasting Corporation/TV5 Network, Inc.)
DYNU-TV UNTV 39      (Progressive Broadcasting Corporation)
DYCS-TV CCTN Channel 47 (Radio Veritas Global Broadcasting, Inc.)

Digital
(PA) 16 All TV Cebu (Advanced Media Broadcasting System) (Pending)
DYTV-DTV 17 IBC Cebu      (Intercontinental Broadcasting Corporation)
DYET-DTV 18 TV5 Cebu (ABC Development Corporation)
DYKC-DTV 19 RPN Cebu (Radio Philippines Network) (Soon on DTT)
DYNZ-DTV 20 A2Z/Light TV (ZOE Broadcasting Network)
(PA) 24 (Swara Sug Media Corporation) (Pending)
DYGA-DTV 25 Hope Channel Central Philippines (Gateway UHF Broadcasting) (Soon on DTT)
DYSS-DTV 26 GMA Cebu      (GMA Network Inc.)
(PA) 28 (Asia Pacific Business and Industrial Systems, Inc.) (Pending)
DYCT-DTV 31 BEAM TV      (Broadcast Enterprises and Affiliated Media)
(PA) 32 (Baycomms Broadcasting Corporation) (Pending)
DYPT-DTV 42 PTV Cebu      (People's Television Network)
DYBU-DTV 43 DZRH TV      (Manila Broadcasting Company)
(PA) 44 (Sarraga Integrated And Management Corporation) (Pending)
DYFA-DTV 45 Golden Nation Network (Global Satellite Technology Services) (Soon on DTT)
DYFX-DTV 49 Net 25 (Eagle Broadcasting Corporation) (Soon on DTT)

Cable Providers
Sky Cable Cebu
Cebu Cable TV
Cine Cebu Television Cable
Cignal TV
G Sat Direct TV

Radio stations

AM
DYRB Radyo Pilipino 540 (Radio Corporation of the Philippines)
DYMR Radyo Pilipinas 576 (Philippine Broadcasting Service)
DYHP RMN 612 (Radio Mindanao Network)
DYRC Aksyon Radyo 648 (Manila Broadcasting Company)
RPN DYKC Radyo Ronda 675 (Radio Philippines Network)
DYAR Sonshine Radio 765 (Swara Sug Media Corporation)
DYLA 909 (Vimcontu Broadcasting Corporation)
DYMF Bombo Radyo 963 (People's Broadcasting Service Inc.)
GMA Super Radyo DYSS 999 (GMA Network Inc.)
DYCM 1152 (Makati Broadcasting Company)
DYRF Radio Fuerza 1215 (Word Broadcasting Corporation)
DYFX Radyo Agila 1305 (Eagle Broadcasting Corporation)
(PA) 1332 (Cable News International, Inc.) (Pending)
DZRH 1395 (Cebu Broadcasting Company)

FM
88.3 XFM (Southern Broadcasting Network)
Power 89.1 (Word Broadcasting Corporation)
89.9 Memories FM (Primax Broadcasting Network)
Q Radio 90.7 (Mareco Broadcasting Network)
91.5 Yes The Best (Cebu Broadcasting Company)
Magic 92.3 (Quest Broadcasting)
93.1 Brigada News FM (Vimcontu Broadcasting Corporation)
93.9 iFM (Radio Mindanao Network)
94.7 Energy FM (Ultrasonic Broadcasting System)
95.5 Star FM (People's Broadcasting Service, Inc.)
96.3 WRocK (Exodus Broadcasting Company)
97.9 Love Radio (Manila Broadcasting Company)
UP 987 (Far East Broadcasting Company)
Barangay RT 99.5 (GMA Network, Inc.)
RJFM 100.3 (Free Air Broadcasting Network, Inc.)
Y101 (GVM Radio/TV Corporation)
101.9 Radyo5 True FM (Nation Broadcasting Corporation)
102.7 Easy Rock (Pacific Broadcasting System)
103.5 Retro Cebu (UM Broadcasting Network)
Halo Halo 105.1 (Ultimate Entertainment)
Monster BT 105.9 (Audiovisual Communicators)
DWIZ 106.7 (Aliw Broadcasting Corporation)
107.5 Win Radio (Mabuhay Broadcasting System)

LPFM
88.1 RYFM (Way Kulba WaveCast Radio)
89.5 Light FM (Adventist Media)
Sowers Radio 103.1 (Minglanilla Missionary Baptist Church)
The Anchor 104.3 (Anchor Baptist Church)
105.6 Heart FM (Mandaue News Center)

 
 
Television stations
Cebu city
Cebu city